The 2010 Turkish Figure Skating Championships ( took place between 8 January and 10 January in Ankara.

Senior results

Men

Ladies

 WD = Withdrawn

Ice dancing

Junior results

Men

 WD = Withdrawn

Ladies

Novice results

Men

Ladies

Pre-novice results

Men

Ladies

External links
 Artistik Buz Pateni Türkiye Şampiyonası Sona Erdi
 Turkish Ice Skating Federation
 

Turkish Figure Skating Championships
Turkish Figure Skating Championships, 2010